Eddystone is a tower-shaped rock or small island, located in the Southern Ocean, off the southern coast of Tasmania, Australia.

Features and location
Eddystone is known for its inaccessibility and distinctive shape, described by Abel Tasman in 1642 as "a tall, obtuse, square tower". A painting from 1823 bears this out, and also shows its proximity to Pedra Branca,  to the west.

Surfers were shown the location by local fishermen, who have known about the break for many years.

The island has negligible plant life. Seabirds recorded as nesting there include Australasian gannets, black-faced cormorants and fairy prions.  Australian and New Zealand fur seals haul-out on the lower ledges when seas are not too rough.

Important Bird Area
Together with the nearby Pedra Branca and Sidmouth Rock the island constitutes the  Pedra Branca Important Bird Area (IBA), identified as such by BirdLife International because it supports over 1% of the world populations of shy albatrosses and Australasian gannets.

Etymology
Eddystone was named by Captain James Cook in 1777 because of its resemblance to Eddystone Lighthouse in Devon, England.

See also

 List of islands of Tasmania

References

Islands of Tasmania
Southern Tasmania
Protected areas of Tasmania
Important Bird Areas of Tasmania